Data & Knowledge Engineering is a monthly peer-reviewed academic journal in the area of database systems and knowledge base systems. It is published by Elsevier and was established in 1985. The editor-in-chief is P.P. Chen (Louisiana State University).

Abstracting and indexing
The journal is abstracted and indexed in Current Contents/Engineering, Computing & Technology, Ei Compendex, Inspec, Science Citation Index Expanded, Scopus, and Zentralblatt MATH. According to the Journal Citation Reports, the journal has a 2020 impact factor of 1.992.

References

External links

Publications established in 1985
Elsevier academic journals
English-language journals
Monthly journals
Knowledge engineering